Personality and Mental Health: Multidisciplinary Studies from Personality Dysfunction to Criminal Behaviour is a quarterly peer-reviewed academic journal published by Wiley-Blackwell on behalf of the Centre for Health and Justice. The journal was established in 2007 and covers research in mental health issues such as DSM-IV-defined personality disorders, psychopathy, and offending behaviour.

According to the Journal Citation Reports, the journal has a 2011 impact factor of 0.733, ranking it 46th out of 59 journals in the category "Psychology Social" and 97th out of 117 in the category "Psychiatry (Social Science)".

References

External links 
 

Wiley-Blackwell academic journals
English-language journals
Publications established in 2007
Quarterly journals
Criminology journals
Psychiatry journals